Bolshaya Vilva is a rural locality (a village) in Vsevolodo-Vilvenskoye Urban Settlement, Alexandrovsky District, Perm Krai, Russia. The population was 2 as of 2010. There are 3 streets.

Geography 
Bolshaya Vilva is located 21 km west of Alexandrovsk (the district's administrative centre) by road. Vsevolodo-Vilva is the nearest rural locality.

References 

Rural localities in Alexandrovsky District